The 1884 United States presidential election in Delaware took place on November 4, 1884, as part of the 1884 United States presidential election. Voters chose three representatives, or electors to the Electoral College, who voted for president and vice president.

Delaware voted for the Democratic nominee, Grover Cleveland, over the Republican nominee, James G. Blaine. Cleveland won the state by a margin of 13.35%.

Results

See also
 United States presidential elections in Delaware

References

Delaware
1884
1884 Delaware elections